Samad Shohzukhurov (born 8 February 1990) is a Tajikistani footballer who last played for Barki Tajik. He is a member of the Tajikistan national football team in the 2010 FIFA World Cup qualification campaign. He also joined the 2007 FIFA U-17 World Cup held in South Korea.

Career statistics

International

Statistics accurate as of match played 13 August 2008

References

External links

1990 births
Living people
Tajikistani footballers
Tajikistan international footballers

Association football midfielders
Tajikistan youth international footballers